Villains by Necessity is a fantasy novel written by Eve Forward.

Synopsis

Over a century after the ultimate triumph of good over evil, the world's last assassin and the world's last thief discover from a druid that, without more evil, the world will be destroyed. With the help of an evil sorceress and a black knight, the party sets out to save it from the misguided forces of good.

Reception

Kirkus Reviews called it "frothy and ingenious", and praised its "agreeable, mildly humorous streak", but ultimately judged it "unsuspenseful and too long". At the Silver Reviews, Steven H Silver considered it to have been "ambitious", but too reminiscent of a Dungeons & Dragons campaign, with "anachronistic" humor, and evil characters whose evilness lacks "any real depth".

References

See also
 List of fantasy novels

1995 American novels
American fantasy novels
Tor Books books
1995 debut novels